The Fallen Worker Memorial is a memorial commemorating workers killed on the job, installed outside the state Labor and Industries building near the Oregon State Capitol in Salem, Oregon, United States. The memorial, which was proposed by Oregon AFL–CIO, approved by the Oregon Parks and Recreation Department, and dedicated in April 2009, features a bronze plaque and benches, cheery trees, and additional landscaping adjacent to the Labor and Industries Building. Construction cost approximately $20,000 and was funded by donations. The site has hosted services in observance of Workers' Memorial Day.

See also

 Workers' Memorial Sculpture (1995), Indianapolis

References

External links
 

2009 establishments in Oregon
Labor monuments and memorials in the United States
Monuments and memorials in Salem, Oregon